The 1995 Liège–Bastogne–Liège was the 81st edition of the Liège–Bastogne–Liège cycle race and was held on 16 April 1995. The race started in Liège and finished in Ans. The race was won by Mauro Gianetti of the Polti team.

General classification

References

1995
1995 in Belgian sport
Liege-Bastogne-Liege
April 1995 sports events in Europe
1995 in road cycling